In Welsh mythology and folklore, Cŵn Annwn ("hounds of Annwn"; singular Ci Annwn were the spectral hounds of Annwn, the otherworld of Welsh myth.

In Wales, they were associated with migrating geese, supposedly because their honking in the night is reminiscent of barking dogs.

Hunting grounds for the Cŵn Annwn are said to include the mountain of Cadair Idris, where it is believed "the howling of these huge dogs foretold death to anyone who heard them".

According to Welsh folklore, their growling is loudest when they are at a distance, and as they draw nearer, it grows softer and softer. Their coming is generally seen as a death portent.

Owner 
Arawn, king of Annwn, is believed to set the Cŵn Annwn loose to hunt mundane creatures. When Pwyll, Prince of Dyfed, saw the Cŵn Annwn take down a stag, he set his own pack of dogs to scare them away. Arawn then came to him and said that as repentance for driving away the Cŵn Annwn, Pwyll would have to defeat Hafgan.

Christians came to dub these mythical creatures as "The Hounds of Hell" or "Dogs of Hell" and theorised they were therefore owned by Satan. However, the Annwn of medieval Welsh tradition is an otherworldly place of plenty and eternal youth and not a place of punishment like the Christian concept of Hell.

The hounds are sometimes accompanied by a fearsome hag called Mallt-y-Nos, "Matilda of the Night". An alternative name in Welsh folklore is Cŵn Mamau ("Hounds of the Mothers").

Da Derga is also known to have a pack of nine white hounds, perhaps Cŵn Annwn.

Culhwch rode to King Arthur's court with two "Otherworld" dogs accompanying him, possibly Cŵn Annwn.

The Wild Hunt 
The Cŵn Annwn are associated with the Wild Hunt. They are supposed to hunt on specific nights (the eves of St. John, St. Martin, Saint Michael the Archangel, All Saints, Christmas, New Year, Saint Agnes, Saint David, and Good Friday), or just in the autumn and winter.  Some say Arawn only hunts from Christmas to Twelfth Night. The Cŵn Annwn also came to be regarded as the escorts of souls on their journey to the Otherworld.

A Ci Annwn's goal in the Wild Hunt is to hunt wrongdoers into the ground until they can run no longer, just as the criminals did to their victims.

Colouring and meaning 
The Cŵn Annwn is associated with death, as it has red ears. The Celts associated the colour red with death. White is associated with the supernatural, and white animals are commonly owned by gods or other inhabitants of the Otherworld. Therefore, the Cŵn Annwn is associated with death and the supernatural.

Similar creatures 
In other traditions similar spectral hounds are found, e.g. Gabriel Hounds (England), Ratchets (England), Yell Hounds (Isle of Man), related to Herne the Hunter's hounds, which form part of the Wild Hunt. Similar hounds occur in Devon - particularly on Dartmoor - and Cornwall but it is not clear whether they stem from Brythonic or Saxon origins.

See also
 Barghest
 Black dog (folklore)
 Black Shuck
 Dip (Catalan myth)
 Gwyllgi
 Hound of the Baskervilles
 Huan
 Wild Hunt

Notes and references

Welsh legendary creatures
Welsh folklore
Mythological dogs
Mythological canines
Dogs in religion
Dogs in the United Kingdom